Dacrydium magnum is a species of conifer in the family Podocarpaceae. It is found in Indonesia and Papua New Guinea. It is threatened by habitat loss.

References

magnum
Near threatened plants
Taxonomy articles created by Polbot
Taxa named by David John de Laubenfels